Anna Kalashnyk (born 8 December 1992) is a Ukrainian artistic gymnast. She won the bronze medal on vault at the 2009 European Championships.

References

1992 births
Living people
Ukrainian female artistic gymnasts